Creggankeel Fort is a stone fort and National Monument located on the island of Inisheer, Ireland. It also contains a later Christian site, the Grave of the Seven Daughters.

Location
Creggankeel Fort is located in the eastern part of Inisheer, overlooking An Loch Mór (the Great Lake, the only freshwater on the island).

History 
The name Creggankeel derives from the Irish creagáin chaoil, "narrow stony place." Stone forts ("cashels") of this type were mostly built in Ireland after the 1st century BC. The walls were reused in the 15th century as part of the outer walls of O'Brien's Castle.

The Grave of the Seven Daughters (Cill na Seacht nIníon), also called An Chill Bheannaithe (the blessed graveyard) is an early Christian site associated with the female saint Moninne. It was established around the 5th or 6th century AD.

Description

The fort is formed from two square drystone walls with a cross inscribed onto a pillar-stone. The Grave of the Seven Daughters is the incomplete circuit of a cashel; there are sleeping niches in the walls reminiscent of the Roman catacombs. The foundations of other buildings are also evident.

Nearby is a structure similar to one seen at Cashelmore (Clogher), County Sligo.

References

Archaeological sites in County Galway
National Monuments in County Galway
Aran Islands
Forts in Ireland